Jane Stuart Woolsey (1830 – ) was an American Civil War nurse, and writer.

Early life 
Jane Stuart Woolsey was born on 1830 in Connecticut.

Career 
She was a member of the Women's Central Relief Association. She was assistant superintendent of the Lovell General Hospital. In 1863 she was Superintendent of Nurses at Fairfax Seminary Hospital. From 1869 to 1872, she taught at Hampton Normal and Agricultural Institute. From 1872 to 1876, she was resident mistress at Presbyterian Hospital.

Works 

 Hospital Days: Reminiscence of a Civil War Nurse (1868)

Death and legacy 
Jane Stuart Woolsey died on 1891 in Fishkill. She is buried at Woolsey Cemetery Glen Cove, New York.

References

External links 

 

Created via preloaddraft
1830 births
1891 deaths
American Civil War nurses